A cementoblast is a biological cell that forms from the follicular cells around the root of a tooth, and whose biological function is cementogenesis, which is the formation of cementum (hard tissue that covers the tooth root). The mechanism of differentiation of the cementoblasts is controversial but circumstantial evidence suggests that an epithelium or epithelial component may cause dental sac cells to differentiate into cementoblasts, characterised by an increase in length. Other theories involve Hertwig epithelial root sheath (HERS) being involved.

Structure

Thus cementoblasts resemble bone-forming osteoblasts but differ functionally and histologically. The cells of cementum are the entrapped cementoblasts, the cementocytes. Each cementocyte lies in its lacuna (plural, lacunae), similar to the pattern noted in bone. These lacunae also have canaliculi or canals. Unlike those in bone, however, these canals in cementum do not contain nerves, nor do they radiate outward. Instead, the canals are oriented toward the periodontal ligament (PDL) and contain cementocytic processes that exist to diffuse nutrients from the ligament because it is vascularized. The progenitor cells also found in the PDL region contribute to the mineralization of the tissue.

Once in this situation,  cementoblasts lose their secretory activity and become cementocytes. However, a layer of cementoblasts is always present along the outer covering of the PDL; these cells can then produce cementum if the tooth is injured (see hypercementosis).

See also 

 Cementum
 Cementogenesis
 Tooth development
 Cementoblastoma
 Enamel
List of human cell types derived from the germ layers

References

External links
 Cementoblasts at http://www.copewithcytokines.de/cope.cgi?key=cementoblasts

Cells
Human cells
Tooth development